Simyra  is a genus of moths of the family Noctuidae. The genus was described by Ochsenheimer in 1816.

Species
Simyra nervosa (Denis & Schiffermüller, 1775) central and southern Europe
Simyra albovenosa (Goeze, 1781) Europe, Turkey, northern Iran, Transcaucasia, Central Asia, southern Siberia 
Simyra dentinosa Freyer, 1838 south-eastern Europe, Turkey, Caucasus, Transcaucasia, Lebanon, Syria, Israel, Egypt, Iran
Simyra albicosta Hampson, 1909 Nilgiri Mountains of India
Simyra capillata Wallengren, 1875 South Africa
Simyra confusa (Walker, 1856) Sri Lanka, Arabia
Simyra conspersa Moore, 1881 Punjab, Sikkim, Bengal
Simyra renimaculata (Osthelder, 1932) Turkey
Simyra saepestriata (Alphéraky, 1895) Japan, Korea, Mongolia
Simyra sincera Warren, 1914
Simyra splendida Staudinger, 1888 Turkestan, Tibet, southern Siberia, Korea
Simyra insularis (Herrich-Schäffer, 1868) Ontario, New York, Massachusetts, Kansas, California, New Mexico, Cuba
Simyra unifacta Dyar, 1912 Mexico

References